Samuel Deduno Lake (born July 2, 1983) is a Dominican former professional baseball pitcher. He has played in Major League Baseball (MLB) for the Colorado Rockies, San Diego Padres, Minnesota Twins and Houston Astros.

Career

Colorado Rockies
Deduno was signed as an undrafted free agent by the Colorado Rockies in 2003. Deduno led the Texas League in strike outs in 2007, but missed the 2008 season with an injury.

Deduno was added to the 40-man roster for the Rockies after the 2008 season.

He was called up to the Rockies on August 26, 2010.

San Diego Padres

He was claimed off waivers by the San Diego Padres on January 28, 2011. On May 23, Deduno was designated for assignment to clear a spot on the 40-man roster for Blake Tekotte.

Minnesota Twins
Deduno signed a minor league contract with the Minnesota Twins on November 17, 2011. On July 5, 2012, he had his contract purchased by the Twins. Deduno recorded his first win on July 22, in a game against the Kansas City Royals. In 2012, Deduno pitched 6–5 with a 4.44 ERA in 15 starts with 6.5 K/9 and 1.08 K/BB.

On November 5, Deduno signed a minor league deal with an invitation to spring training to stay with the Twins. Deduno made 18 starts with the Twins in 2013, and he was 8–8 with a 3.83 ERA, striking out 67 in 108 innings.

Deduno opened 2014 in the Twins bullpen after he lost the 5th starter spot to Kyle Gibson. He made 7 appearances in the bullpen, having a 2.89 ERA in 18.2 innings before being moved to the rotation to replace the injured Mike Pelfrey. Deduno didn't fare so well in the rotation, where in 8 starts, he was 3–5 with a 6.52 ERA and a 1.603 WHIP in 38.2 innings, or less than 5 innings per start. He was moved back to the bullpen on June 17 in favor of Yohan Pino.

Houston Astros
On August 30, 2014, Deduno was claimed off waivers by the Houston Astros. In 14 appearances for Houston in 2014 and 2015, Deduno registered a 5.76 ERA with 26 strikeouts.

Baltimore Orioles
On February 19, 2016, Deduno signed a minor league deal with the Baltimore Orioles. Deduno had undergone hip surgery in the offseason and was not going to be able to pitch until mid season. On August 10, the Orioles released him.

Pitching style
Deduno relies mostly, especially against right-handed hitters, on a four-seam fastball (89–92 mph) and curveball (80–84 mph). He throws a small amount of two-seam fastballs, sliders, and changeups against left-handed hitters. The curve is by far his most common pitch in two-strike counts and when he is ahead in the count.

His four-seamer has the smallest amount of "rise", or vertical break, among all major league starters since 2007. This sinker-like effect gives him the best ground ball/fly ball ratio (6:1) among four-seamers in that group. Remarking on its unusual movement, former Twins catcher Ryan Doumit said, "His fastball's unlike anything I've ever seen. ... It's like catching a 92-mile-an-hour knuckleball."

Deduno has a high walk rate, walking 55 batters in his first 83 innings.

Awards and honors
 2007 Texas League Pitcher of the Week
 2004 Pioneer League Pitcher of the Year
 2004 Pioneer League Post-Season All-Star

References

External links

1983 births
Living people
Águilas Cibaeñas players
Asheville Tourists players
Casper Rockies players
Colorado Rockies players
Colorado Springs Sky Sox players
Dominican Republic expatriate baseball players in the United States
Houston Astros players

Major League Baseball pitchers
Major League Baseball players from the Dominican Republic
Minnesota Twins players
Modesto Nuts players
People from La Romana, Dominican Republic
Rochester Red Wings players
San Diego Padres players
Tri-City Dust Devils players
Tucson Padres players
Tulsa Drillers players
World Baseball Classic players of the Dominican Republic
2013 World Baseball Classic players
2017 World Baseball Classic players